The Bilderberg meeting (also known as the Bilderberg Group) is an annual off-the-record conference established in 1954 to foster dialogue between Europe and North America. The group's agenda, originally to prevent another world war, is now defined as bolstering a consensus around free market Western capitalism and its interests around the globe. Participants include political leaders, experts, captains of industry, finance, academia, numbering between 120 and 150. Attendees are entitled to use information gained at meetings, but not attribute it to a named speaker (known as the Chatham House Rule). This is to encourage candid debate, while maintaining privacy—a provision that has fed conspiracy theories from both the left and right.

Meetings were chaired by Prince Bernhard of the Netherlands until 1975. The current Chairman is French businessman Henri de Castries. Since 1954, the meeting has taken place every year except in 1976, when it was cancelled due to the Lockheed bribery scandals involving Prince Bernhard, and in 2020 and 2021 due to the COVID-19 pandemic.

Origin 

The first conference was held at the Bilderberg Hotel (Hotel de Bilderberg) in Oosterbeek, Netherlands, from 29 to 31 May 1954. The hotel gave its name both to the group and to the "Bilderbergers" who participate in its activities. The hotel is situated in a quiet location, approximately 7 km west of the city of Arnhem. It is owned and operated by the Bilderberg hotel chain, which runs 12 hotels and an event location in the Netherlands and one hotel in Germany. At the time of the 1954 conference, it was a medium-sized family-run hotel.

The conference was initiated by several people, including Polish politician-in-exile Józef Retinger who, concerned about the growth of anti-Americanism in Western Europe, proposed an international conference at which leaders from European countries and the United States would be brought together with the aim of promoting Atlanticism—better understanding between the cultures of the United States and Western Europe to foster cooperation on political, economic, and defense issues.

Retinger approached Prince Bernhard of the Netherlands who agreed to promote the idea, together with former Belgian prime minister Paul van Zeeland, and the then head of Unilever, Paul Rijkens. Bernhard in turn contacted Walter Bedell Smith, the then head of the CIA, who asked Eisenhower adviser Charles Douglas Jackson to deal with the suggestion. The guest list was to be drawn up by inviting two attendees from each nation, one of each to represent "conservative" and "liberal" points of view. Fifty delegates from 11 countries in Western Europe attended the first conference, along with 11 Americans.

The success of the meeting led the organizers to arrange an annual conference. A permanent steering committee was established with Retinger appointed as permanent secretary. As well as organizing the conference, the steering committee also maintained a register of attendee names and contact details with the aim of creating an informal network of individuals who could call upon one another in a private capacity. Conferences were held in France, Germany, and Denmark over the following three years. In 1957, the first U.S. conference was held on St. Simons Island, Georgia, with $30,000 from the Ford Foundation. The foundation also supplied funding for the 1959 and 1963 conferences.

Participants 

The participants are between 120 and 150 people, including political leaders, experts from industry, finance, academia and the media. About two thirds of the participants come from Europe and the rest from North America; one third from politics and government and the rest from other fields. Historically, attendee lists have been weighted toward bankers, politicians, directors of large businesses and board members from large publicly traded corporations, including Wallenberg-owned conglomerate holding company Investor AB and other Wallenberg-owned multinationals such as Ericsson and ABB, IBM, Xerox, Royal Dutch Shell, Nokia and Daimler. Heads of state, including former King Juan Carlos I of Spain and former Queen Beatrix of the Netherlands, have attended meetings. A source connected to the group told The Daily Telegraph in 2013 that other individuals, whose names are not publicly issued, sometimes turn up "just for the day" at the group's meetings.

The banker and industrialist Marcus Wallenberg Jr. was a member of the steering committee and attended the meeting twenty-two times from the 1950s to 1981, a year prior to his death. His grandson Marcus Wallenberg has attended it eight times and his other grandson, Jacob Wallenberg, seventeen times.

Meetings

Activities and goals 
The group's original goal of promoting Atlanticism, of strengthening U.S.-European relations and preventing another world war has grown; according to Andrew Kakabadse, the Bilderberg Group's theme is to "bolster a consensus around free-market Western capitalism and its interests around the globe". In 2001, Denis Healey, a Bilderberg group founder and a steering committee member for 30 years, said, "To say we were striving for a one-world government is exaggerated, but not wholly unfair. Those of us in Bilderberg felt we couldn't go on forever fighting one another for nothing and killing people and rendering millions homeless. So we felt that a single community throughout the world would be a good thing."

According to the web page of the group, the meetings are conducted under the Chatham House Rule, allowing the participants to use any information they gained during the meeting, but not to disclose the names of the speakers or any other participants. According to former chairman Étienne Davignon in 2011, a major attraction of Bilderberg group meetings is that they provide an opportunity for participants to speak and debate candidly and to find out what major figures really think, without the risk of off-the-cuff comments becoming fodder for controversy in the media. A 2008 press release from the "American Friends of Bilderberg" stated that "Bilderberg's only activity is its annual Conference and that at the meetings, no resolutions were proposed, no votes taken, and no policy statements issued." However, in November 2009, the group hosted a dinner meeting at the Château of Val-Duchesse in Brussels outside its annual conference to promote the candidacy of Herman Van Rompuy for President of the European Council.

The Bilderberg meetings are also unofficially called the "Bilderberg Group", "Bilderberg conference" or "Bilderberg Club".

Organizational structure 
Meetings are organized by a steering committee with two members from each of approximately 18 nations. Official posts include a chairman and an Honorary Secretary General. The group's rules do not contain a membership category but former participants receive the annual conference reports. The only category that exists is "member of the steering committee". Besides the committee, there is a separate advisory group with overlapping membership.

Dutch economist Ernst van der Beugel became permanent secretary in 1960, upon Retinger's death. Prince Bernhard continued to serve as the meeting's chairman until 1976, the year of his involvement in the Lockheed affair. The position of Honorary American Secretary General has been held successively by Joseph E. Johnson of the Carnegie Endowment; William Bundy of Princeton University; Theodore L. Eliot Jr., former U.S. ambassador to Afghanistan; and Casimir A. Yost of Georgetown University's Institute for the Study of Diplomacy.

According to James A. Bill, the "steering committee usually met twice a year to plan programs and to discuss the participant list".

In 2002, in Them: Adventures with Extremists, author Jon Ronson wrote that the group has a small central office in Holland  which each year decides what country will host the forthcoming meeting. The host country then has to book an entire hotel for four days, plus arrange catering, transport and security. To fund this, the host solicits donations from sympathetic corporations such as Barclays, Fiat Automobiles, GlaxoSmithKline, Heinz, Nokia and Xerox.

Chairmen of the Steering Committee

Criticism

There have been long standing concerns about lobbying, since senior policymakers meet with corporate lobbyists, and in the case of the 2015 meeting even with senior figures at Transparency International.

Partly because of its working methods to ensure strict privacy and secrecy, the Bilderberg Group has been criticised for its lack of transparency and accountability. 
Ian Richardson sees Bilderberg as the transnational power elite, "an integral, and to some extent critical, part of the existing system of global governance", that is "not acting in the interests of the whole". An article in The Guardian in June 2017 criticized the world view expressed in an agenda published by the Bilderberg group.

Conspiracy theories 
The undisclosed nature of the proceedings has given rise to several conspiracy theories, which have been popular at both extremes of the political spectrum, although there is disagreement about the exact nature of the group's intentions. Some on the left accuse the Bilderberg group of conspiring to impose capitalist domination, while some on the right have accused the group of conspiring to impose a world government and planned economy.

In 2005, Davignon discussed accusations of the group striving for a one-world government with the BBC: "It is unavoidable and it doesn't matter. There will always be people who believe in conspiracies but things happen in a much more incoherent fashion. ... When people say this is a secret government of the world I say that if we were a secret government of the world we should be bloody ashamed of ourselves."

In a 1994 report, Right Woos Left, published by the Political Research Associates, investigative journalist Chip Berlet argued that right-wing populist conspiracy theories about the Bilderberg group date back to as early as 1964 and can be found in Phyllis Schlafly's self-published book A Choice, Not an Echo, which promoted a conspiracy theory in which the Republican Party was secretly controlled by elitist intellectuals dominated by members of the Bilderberg group, whose internationalist policies would pave the way for world communism.

In August 2010, former Cuban president Fidel Castro wrote an article for the Cuban Communist Party newspaper Granma in which he cited Daniel Estulin's 2006 book The Secrets of the Bilderberg Club, which, as quoted by Castro, describes "sinister cliques and the Bilderberg lobbyists" manipulating the public "to install a world government that knows no borders and is not accountable to anyone but its own self."

Proponents of Bilderberg conspiracy theories in the United States include individuals and groups such as the John Birch Society, political activist Phyllis Schlafly, writer Jim Tucker, political activist Lyndon LaRouche, conspiracy theorist Alex Jones, and politician Jesse Ventura, who made the Bilderberg group a topic of a 2009 episode of his TruTV series Conspiracy Theory with Jesse Ventura. Non-American proponents include Lithuanian writer Daniel Estulin and British politician Nigel Farage.

See also 
 Bohemian Club
 Chatham House (The Royal Institute of International Affairs)
 Council on Foreign Relations
 Le Cercle
 List of Bilderberg participants
 Transnational capitalist class
 Trilateral Commission
 Valdai Discussion Club
 World Economic Forum

References

Further reading 

 
 
 
 
 
 
 
  – A short essay on the origins of the group

External links 

 Official website of the Bilderberg conference (since 2010)
 Hotel Website – English Version
 Bilderberg: The Ultimate Conspiracy Theory
 Ex-BBC journalist Tony Gosling: published history on Josef Retinger, Prince Bernhard and Bilderberg group origins
 

 
1954 establishments in the Netherlands
Conspiracy theories
Organizations established in 1954
Transnationalism
Conspiracy theories in the Netherlands
Recurring events established in 1954